Nguyễn Văn Tỵ (Hanoi, 1917 – Hanoi, 19 January 1992) was a Vietnamese painter. He studied art at the École des Beaux-Arts de l’Indochine 1934-41 where classmates included Hoàng Tích Chù and Nguyễn Tiến Chung. In 2001, he was posthumously awarded the Hồ Chí Minh Prize for his contribution to the arts.

References 

1917 births
1992 deaths
Ho Chi Minh Prize recipients
20th-century Vietnamese painters